Oktyabrsky is a rural locality (a settlement) in Aleysky Selsoviet, Aleysky District, Altai Krai, Russia. The population was 120 as of 2013. There are 4 streets.

Geography 
Oktyabrsky is located 22 km south of Aleysk (the district's administrative centre) by road. Mamontovsky is the nearest rural locality.

References 

Rural localities in Aleysky District